The yellow encrusting sponge (Biemna anisotoxa) is a species of sea sponge in the family Biemnidae. This sponge is known from the west coast of South Africa to Port Elizabeth. It is endemic to this region.

Description 
The yellow encrusting sponge is beige-yellow and grows in crusts of up to 1 cm thick. It has small but distinct oscula which may be slightly raised from the surface of the sponge.

Habitat 
This sponge lives on rocky reefs and other hard surfaces from 10-12m.

References

Demospongiae
Sponges described in 1963